S.I.U. (Special Investigations Unit) is a 2011 South Korean action crime film directed by Hwang Byeong-gug, starring Uhm Tae-woong and Joo Won.

Joo Won received nominations for Best New Actor at the 48th Baeksang Arts Awards and the 21st Buil Film Awards in 2012.

Plot
Seong-beom is a foul-mouthed, hot-tempered detective with uncanny animal instincts in the violent crimes section who has never failed to solve a case. While he is on an undercover operation, he hears that a colleague of his has been brutally murdered by an unknown assailant. Seong-beom and the police agency instinctively know there is something behind this murder case. They set up a Special Investigations Unit (S.I.U.), and profiler Ho-ryong, a former FBI agent, is assigned as Seong-beom's partner. As the police dragnet begins to close in, the suspect is always faster than the police. They then receive a suspicious shoot to kill order from high-ranking police officials once the suspect is found. The team must fight against conspiring powers responsible for the crime, all the while dealing with tension and mistrust that begin to build within the police force itself as more information about the case begins to surface that may implicate corrupt detectives within their ranks.

Cast

Uhm Tae-woong as Kim Seong-beom 
Joo Won as Kim Ho-ryong 
Jung Jin-young as Police chief Hwang Doo-soo
Sung Dong-il as Park In-moo  
Lee Tae-im as Jung Young-soon 
Kim Jung-tae as Park Kyeong-sik
Kim Young-jae as Jo Soo-han
Lee Hee-joon as Geun-soo 
Jung Man-sik as Joon-seok 
Jo Jae-yoon as Informant
Park Min-jung as In-moo's younger sister
Jeon Sang-jin as Team leader Jang  
Yoo Seung-mok as Il-do 
Kim Min-jae as Lee Jae-wi 
Ban Min-jeong as Go Soo-jin 
Yeom Dong-heon as Provincial representative 
Im Chae-seon as Ttal Ra-i 
Kim Tae-hee as Big Ong-bak 
Oh Hee-joon as Messenger
Uhm Tae-goo as Skinny Ong-bak

References

External links
 
 

South Korean crime action films
2011 films
2011 crime action films
Lotte Entertainment films
2010s buddy films
2010s South Korean films